Wolin National Park is one of 23 national parks in Poland, situated on the island of Wolin in the far north-west of the country, in West Pomeranian Voivodeship. The park has its headquarters in the town of Międzyzdroje.

The park contains a varied flora and fauna. Its attractions include the sea cliffs of Gosań and Kawcza Góra, and a wisent (European bison) sanctuary.

Gallery

External links 

 
 The Board of Polish National Parks

National parks of Poland
Parks in West Pomeranian Voivodeship
Protected areas established in 1960
1960 establishments in Poland
Kamień County